Project Runway Latin America is a Latin American reality television series on Glitz* which focuses on fashion design and is hosted by model Rebecca de Alba. The contestants compete with each other to create the best clothes and are usually restricted in time, materials and theme. Their designs are judged, and one or more designers are eliminated each week. The show was canceled after its third season.

First Season
The first season was broadcast on Fashion TV Latin America from September 20, 2010 to November 29, 2010. The show was filmed in the city of Buenos Aires, Argentina and the final was filmed on the Atlantis Resort in the Bahamas. The winner won $20,000 to start his or her own collection and be presented in the Puerto Rico High Fashion Week, DF Fashion Week and the cover of Elle Magazine Mexico, plus one week for two at the luxurious Atlantis Resort, in the Paradise Island in the Bahamas, courtesy of the sponsors of the event marks.

It included the participation of 15 designers from Argentina, Brasil, Chile, Colombia, México, Nicaragua, and Venezuela. It is hosted by Mexican model and presenter Rebecca de Alba, who is also part of the jury alongside the Venezuelan designer Ángel Sánchez and the Argentinian journalist and fashion producer Claudia Pandolfo. The designers were mentored by the Argentinian designer Mariano Toledo. The competition was won by Colombian designer Jorge Duque.

There were 12 challenges which included: Pack Attack, A Model for my Model, Film Tour, Makeup, Innovation and Creativity, Burlesque, MasterCard Woman, Woman of the Future, OLAY Challenge, The Color of Divas, Paper Bride and Pantone Challenge. Guests judges for this season included Fabián Zitta, Jorque Lentino, Min Agostini, Hernán Zajar, Sara Galindo, Florencia Raggi, Oscar Madrazo, and Clara González. This season's runner up Shantall Lacayo relocated to the USA and was chosen as a contestant for Project Runway (season 19) eventually winning the season.

 The designer won Project Runway Latin America.
 The designer advanced to fashion week.
 The designer won the challenge.
 The designer was in the top two for that challenge, but did not win.
 The designer had one of the highest scores for that challenge, but did not win.
 The designer had one of the lowest scores for that challenge, but was not eliminated.
 The designer was in the bottom 2, but was not eliminated.
 The designer lost and was out of the competition.

Second Season
The second season premiered September 5, 2011 on Glitz*. The show was filmed in the city of Miami, Florida. The winner will win $30,000 to start his or her own collection, the possibility of presenting his collection at the Mercedes Benz DF Fashion Week México, a magazine photo shoot for Glamour México and Latin America, plus one week for two at the luxurious Live Aqua Cancún Hotel, courtesy of the sponsors of the event marks.

It included the participation of 14 designers from Argentina, Chile, Colombia, México, Uruguay, Puerto Rico, and Venezuela. It is hosted by Mexican model and presenter Rebecca de Alba, who is also part of the jury alongside the Venezuelan designer Ángel Sánchez and the Colombian model and presenter Monica Fonseca. The designers were mentored by the Argentinian designer Mariano Toledo.

 The designer won Project Runway Latin America.
 The designer advanced to fashion week.
 The designer won the challenge.
 The designer had one of the highest scores for that challenge, but did not win.
 The designer had one of the lowest scores for that challenge, but was not eliminated.
 The designer was in the bottom 2, but was not eliminated.
 The designer lost and was out of the competition.

Third Season
The third season aired on September 2, 2013, and was released on Glitz*. It was filmed in Mexico City, Mexico and included the participation of 16 designers from Argentina, Bolivia, Brazil, Chile, Colombia, El Salvador, Mexico, and Venezuela. It was hosted by the Venezuelan presenter Eglantina Zingg, who is also part of the jury along with the Venezuelan designer Angel Sanchez and Mexican Ariadne Grant. The designers were advised by Colombian designer Jorge Duque. The winner received a photo spread in Marie Claire Mexico and Marie Claire Latin America, and the chance to present a fashion show at Miami Fashion Week.

 The designer won Project Runway Latin America.
 The designer advanced to fashion week.
 The designer won the challenge.
 The designer had one of the highest scores for that challenge, but did not win.
 The designer had one of the lowest scores for that challenge, but was not eliminated.
 The designer was in the bottom 2, but was not eliminated.
 The designer lost and was out of the competition.

External links
Official site

See also
Project Runway

References

Project Runway
2010 American television series debuts
2010 Argentine television series debuts
Latin American culture